The  2012 Oldham explosion  occurred on 26 June 2012. A house on Buckley Street in Shaw, a town in the Metropolitan Borough of Oldham, England exploded at 10:40am. Twelve neighbouring homes were destroyed in the blast amounting to £1.2m of damage. 175 homes were evacuated. 30 firefighters were at the site of the blast. A two-year-old boy was killed and one man injured. A gas leak was reported before the explosion. The two-year-old was later named as Jamie Heaton and the man as Jamie's neighbour; 27-year-old Andrew Partington.

Investigation 
Initially, the explosion was thought to have been related to a gas leak, particularly as a smell of gas was reported in the area the previous day. However, on the day of the explosion the Greater Manchester Police released a statement confirming the explosion was being treated as suspicious. The day after the explosion National Grid confirmed there was no gas leak at the site of the explosion.

Gas Worker 
On 27 June 2012, the day after the explosion a 32-year-old man was arrested on suspicion of manslaughter. The man was later reported to be a boiler worker and had examined a boiler at Andrew Partington's house.

On 29 June 2012, the man was released on bail until 9 August 2012, pending further investigations.

On 10 September 2012, Greater Manchester Police confirmed the man was still on bail.

On 12 September 2012, following Andrew Partington (another suspect) appearing at court, the boiler worker was eliminated from police enquiries and released without charge.

Andrew Partington 
On 27 June 2012, Andrew Partington a neighbour was arrested whilst in hospital, in connection with the explosion. However, police were unable to immediately question him.

On 10 September 2012, Andrew Partington was charged with manslaughter and criminal damage.

On 12 September 2012, Partington was refused bail after appearing at Manchester Crown Court by video link.

On 28 November 2012, Partington appeared via video link in court and pleaded guilty to causing the death of Jamie Heaton along with eight charges of destroying neighbouring houses after allowing his home to fill with gas.

On 13 February 2013, Partington was prosecuted for manslaughter and eight charges of destroying properties. He was sentenced to 10 years imprisonment and 5 years on license following his release.

References

External links
Google Earth view of 9 and 11 Buckley Street as after the explosion

Explosions in England
2012 industrial disasters
2012 disasters in the United Kingdom
2012 in England
2010s in Greater Manchester
History of the Metropolitan Borough of Oldham
Shaw and Crompton
Disasters in Greater Manchester
June 2012 events in the United Kingdom